Alain is a genus of crabs belonging to the family Pinnotheridae, and was first described in 1998 by Raymond Manning. The type species of this genus (Alain crosnieri)  was collected in Indonesian territorial waters.

Species
Species accepted by WoRMS are:

Alain crosnieri 
Alain raymondi

References

Pinnotheroidea
Decapod genera
Taxa named by Raymond B. Manning
Crustaceans described in 1998